Gowd-e Hadi (also Romanized as Gowd-e Hādī) is a village in Pariz Rural District, Pariz District, Sirjan County, Kerman Province, Iran. At the 2006 census, its population was 12, in 5 families.

References 

Populated places in Sirjan County